Her Second Chance may refer to:

 Sonjas Rückkehr, a 2006 Swiss film also known as Her Second Chance
 Her Second Chance (1926 film), a lost 1926 silent film